The list of Airfields of the United States Army Air Forces Third Air Force is as follows:

Tactical Airfields
 Dale Mabry Army Airfield
 Dyersburg Army Air Base
 Hattiesburg Bobby L. Chain Municipal Airport
 Hesler-Noble Field
 Hunter Army Airfield
 Imeson Field
 Lakeland Army Air Field
 MacDill Field
 Page Field Army Airfield
 Pinellas Army Air Field
 Venice Army Air Field

Group Training Stations
 Aiken Army Air Field
 Alachua Army Air Field
 Anderson Regional Airport
 Barnwell Regional Airport
 Beauregard Regional Airport
 Blackstone Army Airfield
 Brownwood Regional Airport
 Columbia Army Air Base
 Congree Army Airfield
 Dale Mabry Army Airfield
 Demopolis Army Airfield
 Dyersburg Army Air Base
 Florence Regional Airport
 Gainesville Municipal Airport
 Greenville Army Air Base
 Hatbox Field
 Hattiesburg Bobby L. Chain Municipal Airport
 Hesler-Noble Field
 Hillsborough Army Air Field
 Hunter Army Airfield
 Lake Charles Army Air Field
 Lakeland Army Air Field
 Lowcountry Regional Airport
 MacDill Field
 North Auxiliary Airfield
 Page Field Army Airfield
 Peterson Field
 Pinellas Army Air Field
 Punta Gorda Airport (Florida)
 Thomasville Regional Airport
 Venice Army Air Field
 Waycross–Ware County Airport
 Will Rogers Field

Replacement Training Stations
 Alexandria Army Air Base
 Beauregard Regional Airport
 Blackstone Army Airfield
 Brooksville Army Airfield
 Brownwood Regional Airport
 Columbia Army Air Base
 Congree Army Airfield
 Cross City Air Force Station
 Dale Mabry Army Airfield
 Demopolis Army Airfield
 Dyersburg Army Air Base
 Florence Regional Airport
 Graham Air Base
 Greenville Army Air Base
 Hattiesburg Bobby L. Chain Municipal Airport
 Hawkins Field (airport)
 Hesler-Noble Field
 Hunter Army Airfield
 Immokalee Regional Airport
 Jim Hamilton–L.B. Owens Airport
 Lake Charles Army Air Field
 Lake Wales Municipal Airport
 Lakeland Army Air Field
 MacDill Field
 Page Field Army Airfield
 Perry–Foley Airport
 Pinellas Army Air Field
 Punta Gorda Airport (Florida)
 Scholes International Airport at Galveston
 Venice Army Air Field

Sources
 R. Frank Futrell, “The Development of Base Facilities,” in The Army Air Forces in World War II, vol. 6, Men and Planes, ed. Wesley Frank Craven and James Lea Cate, 142 (Washington, D.C., Office of Air Force History, new imprint, 1983).

Airfields of the United States Army Air Forces in the United States
Lists of United States military installations
United States Army Air Forces lists
Lists of airports in the United States